One & Six is the seventh extended play by South Korean girl group Apink, released by Plan A Entertainment and distributed by LOEN Entertainment on July 2, 2018. The EP features six tracks, with "I'm So Sick" serving as the title track. The album debuted at number one on the Gaon Album Chart, and also entered Billboards World Albums Chart at number 11. The physical release is available in two different versions: "One" and "Six".

Background 
Like their previous albums, members Chorong and Namjoo participated in writing songs for the album. The album name derives from fans being ONE in combination with the SIX members of Apink. The six-member group said the album's title “One & Six” simultaneously represents their vow to show all the different colors of the six members in one album and symbolizes the six members and their fans united as one for the band's seventh anniversary since their debut.

The album's lead single, “I’m So Sick" was co-produced and co-written by famous South Korean production and songwriting duo Black Eyed Pilseung, who worked with Apink back in 2016 for their single "Only One". "I'm So Sick" is a synth-pop and dance track with a chic, mature style, marking the first time Apink strayed from their signature cute and innocent image for the first time since their debut in 2011. The tropical sound of "I'm So Sick" boosted many interests in Apink as they swapped out their girlish image for something more mature.

Promotion 
Apink promoted "I'm So Sick" for 3 weeks as well as the whistle-laden B-side "A L R I G H T" on their comeback stages.

Chart performance
One & Six debuted at number 1 on South Korea's Gaon Album Chart, becoming the group's third chart-topping album in the country while it debuted at number 11 on Billboards World Albums chart, marking the group's highest peak on the chart. The single "I'm So Sick" debuted at number 7 on the Gaon Digital Chart, and peaked at number 3.

Track listing

Awards and nominations

Apink received 5 music program wins for "I'm So Sick" and won for the first time in 3 years on Music Bank. This success was followed by their win on Inkigayo, for the first time in 4 years since "Luv".

Accolades

Charts

Weekly charts

Year-end charts

Sales

Release history

References

External links
 

2018 EPs
Korean-language EPs
Apink albums
Kakao M EPs